Piet Van Brabant (Schaerbeek, 11 March 1932 – Jette, 6 July 2006) was a Belgian journalist, editor of the journal Het Laatste Nieuws, chief editor of the weekly Het Volksbelang, and general secretary of the Liberaal Vlaams Verbond (1960–1996).

Bibliography
 De Vrijmetselaars: reguliere loges in België (1990), Uitgeverij Hadewijch, 
 Lexicon van de Loge, handboek voor vrijmetselaars (1993), Uitgeverij Hadewijch, 
 In het hart van de Loge: Riten, symbolen en inwijdingen (1995), Uitgeverij Hadewijch, 
 P. Van Brabant, W. Blomme, Als een vuurtoren, 85 jaar Liberaal Vlaams Verbond, (1998) Liberaal Archief
 De Christelijke wortels van de Vrijmetselarij (2001), Uitgeverij Houtekiet, 
 De Vrijmetselarij in Nederland en Vlaanderen (2003), Uitgeverij Houtekiet, 
 De spiritualiteit van de Vrijmetselaar (2006), Uitgeverij Houtekiet,

Sources
 Piet Van Brabant (Liberal Archive)
 Vandewalle, E., Encyclopedie van de Vlaamse Beweging, Tielt-Utrecht, Lannoo, 1973, 2 vols., p. 224.

People from Schaerbeek
1932 births
2006 deaths
Flemish journalists